A number of steamships were named Alcyone Fortune, including –
 , in service 1948–51
 , in service 1952–53
 , in service 1956–58

Ship names